Eric Flint (February 6, 1947 – July 17, 2022) was an American author, editor, and e-publisher. The majority of his main works are alternate history science fiction, but he also wrote humorous fantasy adventures. His works have been listed on The New York Times, The Wall Street Journal, The Washington Post, and Locus magazine best seller lists. He was a co-founder and editor of the Baen Free Library.

Early life and education
Born in 1947 in Burbank, California, Flint worked on a Ph.D. in history specializing in southern African history. He left his doctoral program in order to become a political activist in the labor movement and supported himself from that time until age 50 in a variety of jobs, including longshoreman, truck driver, and machinist, and as a labor union organizer. A long-time leftist political activist, Flint worked as a member of the Socialist Workers Party.

Career 
After winning the fourth quarter of 1993 Writers of the Future contest, he published his first novel in 1997 and moved to full-time writing in 1999.

Shortly afterwards, he became the first librarian of the Baen Free Library and a prominent anti–copy protection activist. He has edited the works of several classic SF authors, repackaging their short stories into collections and fix-up novels. This project has met commercial success, and has returned several out-of-print authors to print.

In 2004, faced with a persistent drain on his time by fan-fiction authors seeking comment on the four years old 1632 Tech Manual web forum focused on his 1632 series, he suggested to Jim Baen the experimental serialized fan-fiction e-zine The Grantville Gazette which also found commercial success. Four of the Gazette magazine editions were collated into anthology formats, bought by Jim Baen and brought out in either hardcover or paperback or both formats, though the last purchased remains unpublished. Subsequently, Flint became editor of the new Jim Baen's Universe science-fiction e-zine while concurrently remaining a creative writer bringing out three to five titles per year. After the death of Jim Baen due to a stroke and after completing the contract for the tenth Grantville Gazette, Flint founded a new website, "grantvillegazette.com",which was modeled on the JBU e-zine.  It continued to bring out The Grantville Gazettes, increased the publishing rate from four per year to bimonthly, while paying better than standard magazine pay rates.

He lived with his wife Lucille (also an ex-labor organizer) in East Chicago, Indiana.

In 2008, he donated his archive to the department of Rare Books and Special Collections at Northern Illinois University.

Flint was the author guest of honor for the 2010 NASFiC, ReConStruction.

He also participated in The Stellar Guild series published by Phoenix Pick. The series pairs bestselling authors such as Flint with lesser known authors in science fiction and fantasy to help provide additional visibility to them.

Electronic publishing

Eric Flint is noted as a co-founder and editor of the Baen Free Library which is an ongoing experiment in electronic publishing (e-books in multiple unencrypted formats) where Flint and the late Jim Baen convinced authors to post entirely unprotected free copies of various works for download over the internet. One early goal was to see if the release of free electronic content would increase the sales of their traditional print or (for-pay) electronic editions. As part of the initial phase, Flint has published a series of essays that in form have been part blog and part letters to the editor tracking the experiment and championing the practice.

Financially, it seems to be working out for publisher Baen Books, as they have embraced unencrypted e-book publication for all their works available in a variety of common formats. Usually eighty to a hundred titles are available in the Baen Free Library at any given time. In most cases, the works involved are the early volumes in continuing series, appetite whetters, where readers might be likely to purchase later works in the same series.

All new Baen Books can also be purchased as e-books in the same unencrypted formats as the free library through Baen WebScriptions. As an added wrinkle one can purchase a monthly collection of five bundled works in the release stage of publication at Baen's. Once the bundle reaches four months from its scheduled release date in print, about half of the work is serialized and available to readers purchasing the advanced peek. A month later, the next quarter, followed by the last quarter, available about a month on average ahead of any printed work. The last delivery contains the copyedited e-book version of the book.

One can also purchase electronic Advanced Reader Copies, which are not a part of the monthly bundle, but are available for purchase. These followed a successful experiment with an online eMagazine, called the Grantville Gazette (more below—see 1632 series). They are unproofed manuscripts and are full of typos and errors. They are unedited from the author's word processor; however, they are available even before the first part of the monthly bundles. These copies do not include the final proofed version, which is available only in the single or monthly bundle for that book. In March 2007, Flint began acting as publisher of a for-fee web-access version of the gazette.

Flint also helmed Jim Baen's Universe, an e-zine published from 2006 until 2010.

Death
Flint died on July 17, 2022, at the age of 75 in East Chicago, Indiana.

Bibliography

Reception

To date, six of his books have been included on The New York Times Best Seller list. They are 1634: The Galileo Affair (2004), 1634: The Baltic War (2007), 1634: The Bavarian Crisis (2007), 1636: The Kremlin Games (2013), Torch of Freedom (2009), and Cauldron of Ghosts (2014).

1635: The Papal Stakes (2012), The Crucible of Empire (2010), and Threshold (2010) were listed on The Wall Street Journal Best-Selling Books list for Hardcover Science Fiction.

Cauldron of Ghosts (2014) was listed on The Washington Post Best-Selling Books list for Hardcover Fiction.

Almost all of Flint's books sold well enough to get listed on the various Locus Bestsellers Lists with some titles listed multiple times and a few even reached the top spot for the month.

Awards and honors 

Flint was awarded the 2008 Dal Coger Memorial Hall of Fame Award primarily for his River of War series.

In 2018, he received a Special Sidewise Award for Alternate History for his ongoing encouragement of the genre of alternate history through his support of the community and writers developed around his 1632 series.

References

External links 

 
 Baen catalog of Flint's work
 Flint's catalog of work at Simon & Schuster (also contains publication quality images of book covers)
 Prime Palaver essays, most discussing copy protection and Baen's e-policies, a topic taken up again in the dedicated column in Jim Baen's Universe e-zine:
 Salvos Against Big Brother, Flint's essays against DRM and copyrights in Jim Baen's Universe magazine.
 Editor's column (bimonthly) at Jim Baen's Universe.
 
 

1947 births
2022 deaths
20th-century American male writers
20th-century American novelists
20th-century American short story writers
21st-century American male writers
21st-century American novelists
21st-century American short story writers
American alternate history writers
American book editors
American fantasy writers
American male novelists
American male short story writers
American Marxists
American online publication editors
American political activists
American science fiction writers
American speculative fiction editors
American speculative fiction publishers (people)
Novelists from California
Novelists from Indiana
People from Burbank, California
People from East Chicago, Indiana
Science fiction editors
Sidewise Award winners
University of California, Los Angeles alumni
Place of birth missing